Cheshmeh Bad (also Romanized as Cheshmeh Bād and Chashmeh-ye Bād; also known as Kānī Bā, and Kānībad) is a village in Kivanat Rural District, Kolyai District, Sonqor County, Kermanshah Province, Iran. At the 2006 census, its population was 112, in 21 families.

References 

Populated places in Sonqor County